Matija Sarkic (born 23 July 1997) is a professional footballer who plays as a goalkeeper for EFL Championship club Stoke City on loan from  club Wolverhampton Wanderers and the Montenegro national team.

Sarkic came through the academy of Anderlecht before signing with Aston Villa in 2015. He spent time on loan at Wigan Athletic, for whom he made his Football League debut, non-league clubs Stratford Town and Havant & Waterlooville, and Livingston of the Scottish Premiership, before moving on to Wolverhampton Wanderers in 2020. He then joined Shrewsbury Town and Birmingham City on loan. His loan spell with Birmingham City was cut short due to injury in January 2022.

He was born in England to a Montenegrin father and English mother, and represented Montenegro at youth level before making his debut for the senior national team in November 2019.

Club career

Aston Villa
Sarkic graduated from the youth academy of Belgian club Anderlecht before signing a three-year contract with English club Aston Villa on 1 September 2015. He was the goalkeeper for Villa's under-21 team who reached the Division Two play-off final in the 2015–16 season. In April 2017, he was named on the bench for a league match against Reading as cover for Sam Johnstone following an injury to Mark Bunn.

Sarkic joined Wigan Athletic on 31 August 2017 on a season-long loan. In December 2018, he joined Stratford Town on a youth loan.

On 26 June 2019, Sarkic signed for Scottish Premiership club Livingston on what was intended to be a season-long loan, but he was recalled by Aston Villa on 3 January 2020, as their first-choice goalkeeper Tom Heaton had suffered a knee injury.

Sarkic was offered a contract extension at Aston Villa in 2020 but turned down the offer to look for first-team opportunities elsewhere, having seen experienced 'keeper Pepe Reina brought in as cover for the injured Heaton. Sarkic was formally released by Aston Villa at the end of the 2019–20 season.

Wolverhampton Wanderers
Sarkic signed for Villa's Premier League rivals Wolverhampton Wanderers on 27 July 2020 on a three-year contract.

Shrewsbury Town (loan)
On 2 September 2020, Sarkic joined League One club Shrewsbury Town on a season-long loan. He made his debut on 12 September, starting in a goalless draw away at Portsmouth.

Birmingham City (loan)
Sarkic joined Championship club Birmingham City on 26 July 2021 on loan for the season. With previous first-choice goalkeeper Neil Etheridge still recovering from COVID-19, Sarkic started the opening-day fixture away to Sheffield United and kept a clean sheet as Birmingham won 1–0. He retained his place in the starting eleven even after Etheridge's return to fitness, kept ten clean sheets, and missed only one of Birmingham's 24 league matches. Near the end of what proved to be his last appearance, on 2 January 2022, he dislocated a shoulder throwing the ball out to a defender. The injury required surgery which would keep him out for the rest of the season, and he returned to his parent club for treatment and rehabilitation. Despite only being at the club for the first half of the season, he was voted Birmingham City's Player of the Season for 2021–22.

Return to Wolves
Although Wolverhampton Wanderers' goalkeeping coach, Tony Roberts, thought Sarkic's progress would be better served by playing regularly on another loan, he signed a new three-year contract, and technical director Scott Sellars said that he would remain at the club as backup and competition for José Sá. He made his first-team debut on 23 August 2022, in the EFL Cup second-round 2–1 win against Preston North End.

Stoke City (loan)
On 25 January 2023 Sarkic joined Championship club Stoke City on loan for the remainder of the 2022–23 season.

International career
Sarkic represented Montenegro U17 at the 2013 UEFA European Under-17 Championship. He won the bronze medal at the 2017 Valeri Lobanovsky Memorial Tournament. On 19 November 2019, he made his debut for the Montenegrin senior team under coach Faruk Hadžibegić in a 2–0 friendly win against Belarus. Sarkic made his first competitive appearance for his country in a 2022 World Cup qualifier away to the Netherlands, who won 4–0.

Personal life
Sarkic was born in England, in Grimsby, Lincolnshire. His father, Bojan Šarkić, is a Montenegrin diplomat who, as of October 2017, was the country's ambassador to the European Union. He previously served as ambassador to the United Kingdom and to Belgium. His mother, Natalie Šarkić-Todd, works at a European media network. Matija has a twin brother Oliver Sarkic with whom he played during his spell at Anderlecht.

Career statistics

Club

International

Honours
Aston Villa U23s

 Premier League Cup: 2017–18
Individual

 Birmingham City Player of the Season: 2021–22

References

External links

1997 births
Living people
Footballers from Grimsby
English footballers
Montenegrin footballers
Montenegro youth international footballers
Montenegro under-21 international footballers
Montenegro international footballers
Association football goalkeepers
Aston Villa F.C. players
Wigan Athletic F.C. players
Stratford Town F.C. players
Havant & Waterlooville F.C. players
Livingston F.C. players
Wolverhampton Wanderers F.C. players
Shrewsbury Town F.C. players
Birmingham City F.C. players
Stoke City F.C. players
Southern Football League players
National League (English football) players
Scottish Professional Football League players
English Football League players
English people of Montenegrin descent
Montenegrin people of English descent